The 2014–15 Bradley Braves men's basketball team represented Bradley University during the 2014–15 NCAA Division I men's basketball season. The Braves were led by fourth year head coach Geno Ford, and played their home games at Carver Arena, with one home game at Renaissance Coliseum in Peoria, Illinois. They were members of the Missouri Valley Conference. They finished the season 9–24, 3–15 in MVC play to finish in last place. They advanced to the quarterfinals of the Missouri Valley tournament where they lost to Northern Iowa.

On March 22, head coach Geno Ford was fired. He finished with a four-year record of 46–86.

Roster

Schedule

|-
!colspan=9 style=|  Exhibition

|-
!colspan=9 style=|Non-conference regular season

|-
!colspan=12 style=| Missouri Valley Conference regular season

|-
!colspan=9 style=|  Missouri Valley tournament

References

Bradley Braves men's basketball seasons
Bradley
Bradley Braves men's basketball
Bradley Braves men's basketball